The 2021–22 Mount St. Mary's Mountaineers men's basketball team represented Mount St. Mary's University in the 2021–22 NCAA Division I men's basketball season. The Mountaineers, led by fourth-year head coach Dan Engelstad, played their home games at Knott Arena in Emmitsburg, Maryland as members of the Northeast Conference.

On May 2, 2022, it was announced that the Mountaineers will join the MAAC on July 1, 2022, leaving the NEC where they had been members since 1989.

Previous season
In a season limited due to the ongoing COVID-19 pandemic, the Mountaineers finished the 2020–21 season 12–11, 9–7 in NEC play to finish in fourth place. In the NEC tournament, they defeated Wagner in the semifinals and Bryant in the championship game. As a result, they received the conference's automatic bid to the NCAA tournament as a No. 16 seed in the East region. There they lost in the First Four to Texas Southern.

Roster

Schedule and results
NEC COVID-19 policy provided that if a team could not play a conference game due to COVID-19 issues within its program, the game would be declared a forfeit and the other team would receive a conference win. However, wins related to COVID-19 do not count pursuant to NCAA policy.
|-
!colspan=12 style=| Non-conference regular season

|-
!colspan=12 style=| NEC regular season

|-
!colspan=9 style=| NEC tournament

Source

References

Mount St. Mary's Mountaineers men's basketball seasons
Mount St. Mary's Mountaineers
Mount St. Mary's Mountaineers men's basketball team
Mount St. Mary's Mountaineers men's basketball team